Realizer may refer to:
For its use in mathematics see Order dimension
CA-Realizer, the programming language similar to Visual Basic created by Computer Associates